In Search of Sunrise 2 is the second album in the In Search of Sunrise series mixed by Dutch trance producer and DJ Tiësto, released on 30 November 2000 (see 2000 in music). It was released with a special leaflet inside and with a special slipcase. The mix was recorded in Sydney, Australia; therefore, it has sometimes been mentioned as In Search of Sunrise 2: Australia or In Search of Sunrise 2: Sydney.

Note: The "official" track listing below is incorrect. The track times add up to 79:48, not 76:08. This is because Mekka - Diamondback is not included in versions of this set found online. Diamondback can be heard slightly at the 33:54 mark, but then the set skips to BT - Dreaming.

Track listing

Release history

External links

Tiësto compilation albums
2000 compilation albums